Bogen Chapel is a parish church of the Church of Norway in Evenes Municipality in Nordland county, Norway. It is located in the village of Bogen. It is one of two churches in the Evenes parish which is part of the Ofoten prosti (deanery) in the Diocese of Sør-Hålogaland. The white, wooden church was built in a long church style in 1920 using plans drawn up by the architect Bjarne Romsloe. The chapel seats about 260 people.

See also
List of churches in Sør-Hålogaland

References

Evenes
Churches in Nordland
Wooden churches in Norway
20th-century Church of Norway church buildings
Churches completed in 1920
1920 establishments in Norway
Long churches in Norway